Lala River may refer to:

 Lala, a tributary of the Bistrița in Bistrița-Năsăud County, Romania
 Lala River (Moldova), a tributary of the Moldova River in Romania
 Lala River (Luza), a tributary of the Luza River in Russia

See also 
 Lala (disambiguation)